Jiang Ji (died 18 May 249), courtesy name Zitong, was an official and military general of the state of Cao Wei during the Three Kingdoms period of China. Born in the late Eastern Han dynasty, Jiang Ji started his career as a low-level official in his native Yang Province before becoming a subordinate of Cao Cao, the warlord who controlled the central government towards the end of the Eastern Han dynasty. After the end of the Eastern Han dynasty, he served in the state of Cao Wei through the reigns of the first three emperors – Cao Pi, Cao Rui and Cao Fang – and held various appointments in the military before rising to Grand Commandant, one of the top positions in the central government. During his service in Wei, he was known for being candid in giving advice to the emperor on various issues, including consolidating power, halting labour-intensive construction projects, and officials' abuses of power. In February 249, he joined the regent Sima Yi in staging a successful coup d'état against his co-regent Cao Shuang, but died from illness a few months later.

Early life and career
Jiang Ji was from Ping'e County, Chu State, Yang Province, which is located north of present-day Huai'an, Anhui. He started his career as an accounting officer in the local commandery office and later became a provincial-level attendant officer.

When Jiang Ji was serving in Yang Province, he was known for frequently consuming alcohol. One day, Shi Miao, the magistrate of Shouchun County in Yang Province, came to the provincial office to meet Jiang Ji but the latter was drunk. An angry Shi Miao then left. After he returned to Shouchun, he made a wooden statue, labelled it "Jiang Ji the drunkard", placed it in front of a wall, and fired arrows at it day and night.

Battle of Hefei

In 208, the warlord Sun Quan, who controlled the territories in the Jiangdong (or Wu) region, led his forces to attack Hefei, the administrative centre of Yang Province, which was guarded by the provincial governor Liu Fu. At the time, Cao Cao, the warlord who controlled the Han central government, was at war with Sun Quan's forces in Jing Province and could not come to Liu Fu's aid. He sent a general Zhang Xi to lead 1,000 horsemen to reinforce Hefei. Zhang Xi also received an order to bring along additional troops from the garrison at Runan Commandery (汝南郡; around present-day Xi County, Henan) along the way to Hefei.

In the meantime, Jiang Ji secretly suggested to Liu Fu to spread false news that Zhang Xi was leading 40,000 troops to reinforce Hefei, and that the reinforcements had reached Yulou County (雩婁縣; north of present-day Jinzhai County, Anhui). Liu Fu agreed and sent three messengers to bring fake letters out of Hefei. Only one of the three returned; the other two were captured by Sun Quan's forces. Sun Quan saw the letters and mistakenly believed that enemy reinforcements were approaching, so he ordered his troops to burn down their camp and retreat back to Jiangdong. The siege on Hefei was thus lifted.

Service under Cao Cao

Advising Cao Cao against relocating the residents of Huainan
In 209, when Jiang Ji met Cao Cao in Qiao County (譙縣; present-day Bozhou, Anhui), the latter asked him: "In the past, when I was at war with Yuan Shao at Guandu, I wanted to relocate the residents in Yan and Boma, but they refused to move. The enemy also did not dare to force them to move. Today, I want to relocate the residents of Huainan. What should I do?"

Jiang Ji replied: "At the time, you were weak while your enemy was strong. If you didn't relocate those people, you would lose them to your enemy. However, since you defeated Yuan Shao, conquered Liucheng in the north, and advanced south towards the Yangtze and Han rivers and Jing Province, the Han Empire has trembled before your might and the people no longer think about opposing you. As people are emotionally attached to their homes, they wouldn't want to relocate elsewhere. If you force them to, they will feel fearful and uneasy."

Cao Cao ignored Jiang Ji's advice and tried to force the people of Huainan to relocate. Jiang Ji was proven right as over 100,000 people from Huainan fled south across the Yangtze and settled in Jiangdong.

Some years later, when Jiang Ji visited Cao Cao in Ye (in present-day Handan, Hebei), Cao Cao laughed and told him: "I wanted to move those people further away from the enemy but ended up scaring them away instead."

Cao Cao's trust in Jiang Ji
Jiang Ji was subsequently appointed as the Administrator of Danyang Commandery (丹楊郡; around present-day Xuancheng, Anhui). In late 209, after Cao Cao ordered his forces to retreat from Jing Province following their defeat at the Battle of Jiangling, he appointed Wen Hui as the Inspector of Yang Province. He also reassigned Jiang Ji to serve as an attendant officer under Wen Hui, and sent him a memo as follows: "When Ji Zha was a minister, the state of Wu should have had a ruler. Now that you have returned to your home province, I will have no worries."

On one occasion, when Cao Cao heard that some people have formally accused Jiang Ji of being the mastermind behind a treasonous plot, he wrote to Yu Jin and Feng Ren: "How could Jiang Ji be involved in something like this? If this really happened, it means that I am not a good judge of character. I am certain that the people are trying to stir up trouble by making such a false accusation." He also sent them a copy of his memo to Jiang Ji, and pressured them to throw out the case against Jiang Ji.

Jiang Ji was later reassigned to be a clerk in the office of the Imperial Chancellor, the position held by Cao Cao in the Han central government. Cao Cao sent a memo to Jiang Ji as follows: "When Gao Yao served under Emperor Shun, he caused those who were unkind and uncharitable to shun away. I place my hopes in a virtuous subordinate like you to uphold fairness."

Battle of Fancheng

In 219, Guan Yu, a general under a rival warlord Liu Bei, led his troops to attack Fancheng (樊城; present-day Fancheng District, Xiangyang, Hubei), which was guarded by Cao Cao's general Cao Ren. Cao Cao initially sent his general Yu Jin to lead reinforcements to Fancheng to assist Cao Ren, but a flood destroyed the reinforcements, and Yu Jin surrendered to Guan Yu. Upon learning of Yu Jin's defeat, Cao Cao felt that the imperial capital, Xu (許; present-day Xuchang, Henan), was too near enemy territory, so he considered moving the imperial capital further north into Hebei.

Jiang Ji and Sima Yi advised Cao Cao: "Yu Jin's defeat was not due to flaws in our defences, nor would it significantly affect us. Moving the imperial capital is showing our weakness to the enemy. It will cause panic in the regions around the Huai and Mian rivers. Sun Quan and Liu Bei seem close to each other, but they actually don't trust each other. Sun Quan will feel very uneasy upon seeing Guan Yu's victory, so we should incite him to attack Guan Yu's base in Jing Province. This will lift the siege on Fancheng."

Cao Cao heeded Jiang Ji and Sima Yi's advice and did not relocate the imperial capital. In the winter of 219–220, Sun Quan ordered his general Lü Meng to lead his troops to attack the key bases of Liu Bei's territories in Jing Province: Gong'an and Jiangling counties. Guan Yu, who was totally caught off guard by Lü Meng's invasion, lost all of Liu Bei's territories in Jing Province. He was eventually captured in an ambush and executed by Sun Quan's forces.

Service under Cao Pi
After Cao Cao died in March 220, his son Cao Pi succeeded him as the vassal King of Wei under the Eastern Han dynasty. Cao Pi then reassigned Jiang Ji to be the Chief Clerk under Hua Xin, the Chancellor of State of his vassal kingdom at the time. In December 220, Cao Pi usurped the throne from the figurehead Emperor Xian, ended the Eastern Han dynasty, and established the state of Cao Wei (or Wei) to replace the Eastern Han dynasty with himself as the new emperor.

After his coronation as emperor, Cao Pi appointed Jiang Ji as East General of the Household. When Jiang Ji sought permission to remain in the central government, Cao Pi denied him permission and issued an imperial decree to him as follows: "Emperor Gaozu once sang, 'Where will I find brave men to guard the four corners of my land?' The Empire is not peaceful yet. We need capable officials to guard the borders. It is still not too late for you to retire when the borders are peaceful." Jiang Ji later wrote the Wan Ji Lun (萬機論; Myriad Subtleties), a treatise on government, and presented it to Cao Pi, who applauded his work. Jiang Ji was subsequently recalled to the central government to serve as a Mounted Regular Attendant.

Cautioning Cao Pi against issuing an inappropriate edict
On one occasion, Cao Pi sent an edict to his general Xiahou Shang as follows: "You are one of my most trusted generals and you are capable of assuming this responsibility. My kindness towards you is worth dying for, and my favour towards you is worth keeping close to your heart. You can do as you please, and you can decide whether people should live or die." He then showed a copy of the edict to Jiang Ji and asked him, "What do you think of the culture in this Empire?"

Jiang Ji replied, "I don't see anything good. I only see words suggesting an empire's downfall." When a shocked Cao Pi asked him to explain, Jiang Ji said, "History has warned us against 'doing as you as please'. The ancients also cautioned us that 'the Son of Heaven should not speak in jest'. I hope that Your Majesty will be more careful with your words!" Cao Pi understood what Jiang Ji meant and immediately rescinded his edict.

Battle of Ruxu

In 222, Jiang Ji accompanied the Wei general Cao Ren on a campaign against Wei's rival state, Eastern Wu, and led a detachment of troops to attack Xianxi (羨溪; northeast of present-day Wuwei County, Anhui). When Cao Ren wanted to attack the Wu-controlled dock at Ruxu (濡須; north of present-day Wuwei County, Anhui), Jiang Ji warned him: "The enemy has occupied the west riverbank and lined up their ships on the upper stream. By leading your troops to attack the island, you are heading straight into hell. This is a path to defeat and destruction." When Cao Ren ignored Jiang Ji's advice and led his troops to attack Ruxu, he ended up being defeated by the Wu defenders.

After Cao Ren died in 223, Cao Pi reassigned Jiang Ji to serve as East General of the Household again and put him temporarily in charge of the units which used to be under Cao Ren's command. He sent an edict to Jiang Ji as follows: "You are well-versed in both civil and military affairs, and you are loyal and passionate. As I know that you have the ambition of crossing the river and conquering Wu, I hereby put you in this position of military command." However, not long later, he removed Jiang Ji from his command and reassigned him to serve as a Master of Writing in the imperial secretariat.

Incident at Guangling

Between September and December 224, Cao Pi went on an inspection tour of Qiao Commandery (譙郡; around present-day Bozhou, Anhui), he decided to set sail along the Huai River towards Guangling Commandery (廣陵郡; around present-day Huai'an, Jiangsu), where he had stationed a naval fleet of over 100,000 troops in preparation for an invasion of the Wu capital, Jianye (present-day Nanjing, Jiangsu).

During this time, Jiang Ji wrote a memorial to the emperor to inform him that the harsh winter weather made it difficult for vessels to sail through the waterways into the Yangtze. He also wrote an essay, "San Zhou Lun" (三州論; "Essay on the Three Provinces"), to indirectly persuade Cao Pi to turn back, but the emperor ignored him and ordered his vessels to sail to Guangling Commandery anyway. At Guangling Commandery, after seeing the weather and the Wu defences, the emperor gave up on his plan for invasion and retreated. The Wu general Sun Shao seized this opportunity to send his subordinate Gao Shou and 500 men to launch a night raid on Cao Pi's convoy. They succeeded in their attempt and even made off with the parasol of Cao Pi's chariot.

As the Wei naval fleet was stranded due to the weather, some officials proposed that the troops go ashore, break up into agricultural colonies, and start growing crops to ensure that they have adequate food supplies (i.e., the tuntian system). Jiang Ji, however, strongly objected to this approach as he thought that it was too dangerous because the colonies would be too near the Chao Lake to the east and the Huai River to the north, so the Wu forces could take advantage of the high tide period to attack them.

Cao Pi heeded Jiang Ji's advice and brought along his troops as they retreated by land. By the time they reached the Jing Lake, the tide had subsided so Cao Pi left behind all the vessels for Jiang Ji to dispose of them. As the vessels were all scattered along the waterways, Jiang Ji ordered his men to dig an additional four or five connecting waterways, gather all the vessels in one location, and build a dam there to block the flow of water from the lake. When the dam was full, they opened it and allowed the force of the water to flush all the vessels out of the waterways into the Huai River.

After Cao Pi returned to the Wei capital, Luoyang, he told Jiang Ji: "I have to tell you something. I originally wanted to burn down half of all the vessels in the Shanyang Pool, but you disposed of those vessels and even managed to return to Qiao Commandery around the same time as me. Every piece of advice you gave me thus far is in line with my thoughts. From now on, if we have any plans on attacking the enemy, I hope you will share your views and participate in the discussions."

Service under Cao Rui
In 227, after Cao Rui succeeded his father Cao Pi as the emperor of Wei, he enfeoffed Jiang Ji as a Secondary Marquis.

Battle of Shiting

In the following year, when the Wei general Cao Xiu led his troops to attack Wu forces at Wan (皖; present-day Qianshan County, Anhui), Jiang Ji wrote a memorial to Cao Rui as follows: "I do not think it is advisable for Cao Xiu to lead his men deep into enemy territory to engage Sun Quan's elite troops. Besides, there is a risk that Zhu Ran and the Wu forces stationed upstream would attack Cao Xiu from the rear." When Cao Xiu and his army reached Wan, the Wu forces advanced to Anlu. After hearing about this, Jiang Ji wrote another memorial to Cao Rui: "The enemy is pretending to attack from the west when they actually plan to attack from the east. Your Majesty should quickly send reinforcements to help them."

At the time, Cao Xiu and his army had fallen into a Wu ambush at Shiting (石亭; near present-day Qianshan County, Anhui) and suffered heavy casualties in addition to losing weapons, armour and equipment. Just when the Wu forces were preparing to trap Cao Xiu and his surviving men at Jiakou, Wei reinforcements showed up so the Wu forces retreated and thus Cao Xiu managed to survive. Jiang Ji was subsequently reassigned to serve as Central Protector of the Army.

Advising Cao Rui on centralising power
At the time, Jiang Ji perceived that the officials who held two key appointments in the imperial palace – Prefect of the Palace Writers and Supervisor of the Palace Writers – wielded too much power, so he wrote a memorial to Cao Rui as follows: 

In response, Cao Rui sent Jiang Ji an edict which read: "Rulers rely on subjects of strong character. (Jiang) Ji is well-versed in both civil and military affairs and he performs his duties faithfully. Every time there is a discussion on major issues, he will either send in a memorial or speak up to express his views. I am very impressed by his initiative and loyalty." Cao Rui then promoted Jiang Ji to General Who Protects the Army and granted him an additional appointment as a Mounted Regular Attendant.

Advising Cao Rui against attacking Liaodong
In 232, Cao Rui wanted to order Tian Yu and Wang Xiong, who were respectively the governors of Ping and You provinces, to lead their troops to attack the Liaodong region, which was then ruled by the warlord Gongsun Yuan, a vassal of the Cao Wei state. Tian Yu and Wang Xiong would lead their forces to attack Liaodong via sea and land respectively.

When Jiang Ji heard about it, he wrote a memorial to Cao Rui to dissuade the emperor from attacking Liaodong: 

Cao Rui ignored Jiang Ji's advice and ordered Tian Yu to go ahead and attack Liaodong. Tian Yu and his troops pulled back without any success from the campaign.

Advising Cao Rui against his construction projects
During the Jingchu era (237–239) of Cao Rui's reign, the Cao Wei state not only frequently waged war against its rival states Eastern Wu and Shu Han, but also embarked on labour-intensive palace construction projects. The wars and projects took a heavy toll on the common people and incurred much public resentment against the Wei government. To make matters worse, the poor harvest during those years also led to a shortage of grain.

Jiang Ji wrote a memorial to Cao Rui as follows: 

In response, Cao Rui sent Jiang Ji an edict which read: "If I did not have you, General Who Protects the Army, I will not be able to hear such advice."

Analysing Gongsun Yuan's alliance with Sun Quan
In 238, when Gongsun Yuan learnt that Cao Rui was planning to attack him, he pledged allegiance to Sun Quan, the emperor of Eastern Wu, and asked Sun Quan to send reinforcements to Liaodong to help him. When Cao Rui heard about it, he asked Jiang Ji, "Do you think Sun Quan will send troops to Liaodong?"

Jiang Ji replied: "He knows that our defences are strong and that he won't gain any advantage. If he sends his forces deep into enemy territory, it won't be a sustainable campaign; if he attacks only the periphery, it will be a waste of manpower and resources for him. Sun Quan doesn't even care when his sons and brothers are in danger, so why would he care about a distant ally who has humiliated him before? The reason why he is spreading news that he will be sending aid to Gongsun Yuan is because he wants to confuse us. He will only take action if we fail to defeat Gongsun Yuan. However, as we are separated by land and water from Liaodong, if we attack Liaodong, we must ensure that we conquer it swiftly, or else Sun Quan might send lightly armed forces to launch small raids at our borders. This is something we should be wary of."

Service under Cao Fang
In 239, following Cao Rui's death, his adopted son Cao Fang succeeded him as the next emperor of Wei. After his coronation, Cao Fang reassigned Jiang Ji to serve as General Who Leads the Army and enfeoffed him as the Marquis of Changling Village. On 1 September 242, he promoted Jiang Ji to the position of Grand Commandant to replace Man Chong, who died some months earlier.

Debate on the Cao clan's ancestry
When there was a discussion in the imperial court on the ritual for ancestor veneration in outdoor settings, Gaotang Long suggested that the emperor should also worship the mythical Emperor Shun, who was believed to be the ancestor of the Cao clan, the imperial clan of Wei. Jiang Ji, however, disagreed and wrote a memorial to point out that Gaotang Long was wrong. He noted that the mythical emperor's family name was actually Gui and that his descendants later adopted Tian as their family name, therefore he was not an ancestor of the Cao clan.

In his annotations to Jiang Ji's biography in the Sanguozhi, Pei Songzhi recorded that Jiang Ji claimed that there was a line on Cao Teng's tombstone which read: "The Cao clan originated from Zhu". Pei Songzhi also noted that the Book of Wei, the official history of the Cao Wei state, confirmed Jiang Ji's claim.

However, Pei Songzhi also pointed out that there was evidence which contradicted Jiang Ji's claim. When Cao Cao wrote his own family history, he mentioned that he descended from Cao Shu Zhenduo, the first ruler of the vassal state of Cao and a member of the royal clan of the Zhou dynasty. Cao Cao's son Cao Zhi also wrote in a eulogy for his father that they descended from the royal clan of the Zhou dynasty. In the early Jingchu era (237–239), Cao Rui accepted Gaotang Long's claim that the Wei emperors descended from Emperor Shun. When the Jin dynasty replaced the Cao Wei state, Cao Huan's abdication statement contained the following line: "my imperial ancestor was Yu (Shun)". This resulted in greater discrepancies between sources on the Cao clan's ancestry.

Gaotang Long was not the only person whom Jiang Ji argued with over the ancestry of the Cao clan. Jiang Ji also debated extensively with Miao Xi and they wrote to each other several times throughout the debate. Their writings, however, were not recorded in history as there were too many. Although Jiang Ji ultimately could not determine the Cao clan's ancestry, he concluded that it was nonsensical and disrespectful to honour Emperor Shun as the Cao clan's ancestor when he was not, and that doing so would be equivalent to insulting Cao Cao. The mistake was not corrected at the time.

Speaking up against Cao Shuang's abuses of power
Between 239 and 249, the regent Cao Shuang effectively controlled the central government and monopolised power. His supporters, who included Ding Mi and Deng Yang, changed the laws to suit their purposes whenever they wanted.

When there was a solar eclipse, Cao Fang summoned all the officials to ask them if it was a bad omen. In response to the emperor's question, Jiang Ji wrote a memorial as follows:

Incident at Gaoping Tombs

On 5 February 249, Jiang Ji joined Sima Yi, Cao Shuang's co-regent, in staging a coup d'état against Cao Shuang when Cao Shuang was away with Cao Fang on a visit to the Gaoping Tombs. After Sima Yi and his supporters seized control of the imperial capital Luoyang, Jiang Ji accompanied them as they led their troops to the floating bridge above the Luo River outside Luoyang. There, Sima Yi sent a memorial to Cao Fang, listing out Cao Shuang's "crimes" (e.g., not fulfilling his duty as regent, corrupting the government) and requesting the emperor to remove Cao Shuang and his brothers from their positions of power. Cao Shuang ultimately surrendered and relinquished his powers as regent to Sima Yi. On 9 February 249, a powerless Cao Shuang, along with his family, his supporters and their families, were rounded up and executed on charges of treason.

Later life and death
After the coup d'état, Cao Fang issued an edict to elevate Jiang Ji from the status of a village marquis to a Marquis of a Chief District and award him a marquisate comprising 700 taxable households. However, Jiang Ji declined the honour and wrote a memorial as follows: 

Cao Fang denied him permission and insisted that he accept the peerage and marquisate. The Jin dynasty historian Sun Sheng praised Jiang Ji for showing good conscience when he declined the honour. He remarked that Jiang Ji's behaviour fit the saying: "neither was he tempted by greed nor did he feel ashamed of being righteous".

Jiang Ji died on 18 May 249 and was honoured with the posthumous title "Marquis Jing".

The Shiyu recorded that during the Incident at Gaoping Tombs, Jiang Ji wrote to Cao Shuang and promised him that Sima Yi only wanted him to give up his powers as regent. When Cao Shuang was executed after his downfall, Jiang Ji felt so upset for failing to keep his promise that he fell sick and eventually died a few months later.

Family and descendants
Jiang Ji's son, Jiang Xiu, inherited his father's peerage as a Marquis of a Chief District. After Jiang Xiu died, his son Jiang Kai inherited the peerage in turn. During the Xianxi era (264–265), the Cao Wei government established a new five-rank nobility system and converted Jiang Kai's peerage to the Viscount of Xiacai.

Encounter with the supernatural
When Jiang Ji held the position of General Who Leads the Army, his wife dreamt about their deceased son crying out to her: "I am separated from you by death. When I was still alive, I was a son of a government official and general. Now when I am in the netherworld, I have become a lowly servant to the gods of Mount Tai. I feel so depressed and humiliated! There is a scholar-official called Sun E (孫阿) who lives west of the imperial ancestral temple. He will soon be summoned to the netherworld to serve as the magistrate of Mount Tai. I hope that you, Mother, can help me ask Father to inform Sun E and request him to reassign me to a better place." After Jiang Ji's wife woke up, she told her husband about her dream, but he dismissed it and said, "It's just a dream. There's nothing to worry about."

The following night, Jiang Ji's wife dreamt about her son again. This time, he told her: "I am here to welcome the new magistrate from the imperial ancestral temple. I am able to visit you now as I still have some free time before my mission starts. The new magistrate will be leaving tomorrow at noon. As I will be very busy tomorrow, I won't be able to visit you. I hope that you will speak to Father again. There is no harm trying." He then described Sun E's physical appearance in detail. In the morning, Jiang Ji's wife told her husband: "As you said, there's nothing to worry about since it's a dream. However, this is too much of a coincidence. Besides, there is no harm trying."

Jiang Ji then sent his men to find Sun E, and they found him near the imperial ancestral temple. He looked exactly like how Jiang Ji's son described him. Jiang Ji shed tears and said, "I nearly let my son down!" He then told Sun E about his wife's dreams. When Sun E heard that he was going to die soon, he was not afraid at all and even felt delighted when he heard that he would become a magistrate in the netherworld. He told Jiang Ji, "If what you said is true, I am most willing to help him. However, I don't know what your son wants." Jiang Ji replied, "Maybe you can just assign him to a job that he enjoys doing." After Sun E promised Jiang Ji that he would do so, Jiang Ji presented him expensive gifts and returned to his office.

As Jiang Ji was eager to verify his wife's dreams, he deployed a line of guards from his office to the imperial ancestral temple, with a space of 10 steps between every two guards, so that they could relay any information from the temple to him in the shortest time possible. Later that morning, he heard that Sun E suffered a heart attack. By noon, he received news that Sun E was dead. He wept and said, "Although I feel sad that my son died early, I am also pleased to know that he will be doing well in the netherworld." A month later, Jiang Ji's wife told her husband that she dreamt about their son again, and he told her that Sun E had reassigned him to be a secretary/scribe.

See also
 Lists of people of the Three Kingdoms

Notes

References
Citations from the Sanguozhi

Citations from the Sanguozhi zhu

Other citations

 Chen, Shou (3rd century). Records of the Three Kingdoms (Sanguozhi).
 
 Fang, Xuanling (648). Book of Jin (Jin Shu).
 Pei, Songzhi (5th century). Annotations to Records of the Three Kingdoms (Sanguozhi zhu).
 

Year of birth unknown
249 deaths
Cao Wei politicians
Officials under Cao Cao
Politicians from Bengbu
Han dynasty politicians from Anhui